William Henry Fitzhugh Lee (May 31, 1837 – October 15, 1891), known as Rooney Lee (often spelled "Roony" among friends and family) or W. H. F. Lee, was the second son of General Robert E. Lee and Mary Anna Custis. He was a planter, a Confederate cavalry General in the American Civil War, and later a Democratic Congressman from Virginia.

Early life
Lee was born at Arlington House in Arlington, Virginia, and named for William Henry Fitzhugh, his mother's uncle. At an early age, his father began to call him Rooney; what prompted him to use this nickname is not known, but it stuck as a way to differentiate him from his cousin Fitzhugh Lee.

Rooney Lee attended Harvard University, where he befriended Henry Adams, who wrote about his relationship with Lee in chapter four of his autobiography, The Education of Henry Adams.

Lee followed in his father's footsteps after graduation, entering the United States Army in 1857 as a second lieutenant. He served with the 6th U.S. Infantry under Albert Sidney Johnston, and participated in the Utah War against the Mormons. In 1859, he resigned from the U.S. Army to operate his White House Plantation, on the south shore of the Pamunkey River, in New Kent County, Virginia.

Civil War
With the outbreak of the Civil War, Lee was commissioned as a captain in the Confederate Army cavalry and was soon promoted to major. He initially served as a cavalry commander for Brig. Gen. William Loring in the mountains of western Virginia during his father's Western Virginia Campaign.  Loring's forces were transferred to the lower Shenandoah Valley and the command of Stonewall Jackson in late 1861, and occupied the town of Romney in early 1862. Lee was soon after assigned to the command of Maj. Gen. J.E.B. Stuart, who was leading the cavalry forces for Joseph E. Johnston's Army of Northern Virginia, in the Peninsula Campaign. After joining Stuart, Rooney Lee's regiment participated in Stuart's first ride-around the Union army, as well as the subsequent Seven Days Battles around Richmond. During this time, Rooney's nearby White House plantation was burned to the ground, and his son Robert died of typhoid fever.

During the Northern Virginia Campaign, Rooney played a leading role in Stuart's well-crafted attack on General John Pope's supply base at Catlett's Station on August 22, 1862, capturing a paymaster's safe full of Yankee greenbacks.  His cavalry regiment was assigned to the brigade of Brig. Gen. Fitzhugh Lee, his cousin, for the Maryland Campaign. Following the Battle of South Mountain, Lee was knocked unconscious after a horse fell from under him, and was unable to participate in the Battle of Antietam.  Upon his recovery, he temporarily commanded Fitzhugh Lee's cavalry brigade in Stuart's Chambersburg Raid; his conduct earning him promotion to brigadier general.  He then commanded the 3rd Brigade of Stuart's Cavalry Division at the Battles of Fredericksburg mere weeks after the death of his infant daughter.  During the Battle of Chancellorsville the following year, Lee was detached from Stuart's cavalry to defend against Stoneman's 1863 Raid.

At the beginning of the Gettysburg Campaign, Lee was shot in the thigh during combat at Brandy Station.  He spent the next two weeks recovering at Hickory Hill, Virginia, before being captured by Union forces.  As a prisoner of war, he was sent to Fort Monroe for several months, before being shipped to New York, where he was held until returned to the Confederate Army on February 25, 1864, in exchange for Union Brig. Gen. Neal S. Dow.

In April 1864, Lee was promoted to major general and commanded a division in the Cavalry Corps during the battles of The Wilderness; Todd's Tavern; Spotsylvania Court House; and North Anna in the Overland Campaign. With the death of Jeb Stuart, Rooney Lee's role increased. Lee's cavalry division patrolled the extreme right of the Confederate lines during the Siege of Petersburg, defending against the Wilson-Kautz Raid at Staunton River Bridge, Sappony Church and First Ream's Station. His division was then sent north to briefly aid in the defense of Richmond at the Second Battle of Deep Bottom, before supporting General Wade Hampton III's Beefsteak Raid, and then returning to Petersburg for the Battle of Boydton Plank Road.

By last year of the war, Rooney Lee had risen to second-in-command of the Confederate cavalry in Virginia; General Hampton having been transferred to South Carolina to raise troops, and Lee's cousin, Fitzhugh, promoted to overall command. Lee's cavalry division screened the Confederate evacuation of Petersburg, notably at the Battle of Namozine Church during the Appomattox Campaign.  He surrendered along with his father at Appomattox Court House with only 300 officers and men, one-tenth the size of the command during the Petersburg Campaign.

Postbellum career
Lee returned to White House Plantation and planting after the war. Nearby, his younger brother Rob lived at Romancoke Plantation across the river in King William County.

He moved there with his family from White House.

In 1875 Rooney was elected to the Virginia Senate, serving until 1878. He was elected as a Democrat to the United States House of Representatives in 1887. He served in the House until his death at Ravensworth in 1891. He is interred in the University Chapel at Washington and Lee University in Lexington, Virginia, with his parents and siblings.

Marriage and family
Lee married twice, first in 1859 to Charlotte Georgiana Wickham, daughter of George and Charlotte Carter Wickham and a descendant of the attorney John Wickham and his wife. They had two children, Robert Edward Lee (March 11, 1860 – June 30, 1862) and Charlotte Carter Lee (October 19, 1862 – December 6, 1862). Charlotte Georgiana Wickham Lee died December 26, 1863.

On November 28, 1867, he married Mary Tabb Bolling. They had two sons, who both lived to adulthood: Robert Edward Lee III (February 11, 1869 at Petersburg – September 7, 1922 at Roanoke, VA) and George Bolling Lee (August 30, 1872 at Lexington – July 13, 1948 at New York, NY).

Lee's mother, Mary Anna Randolph Custis, was the only surviving child of George Washington Parke Custis and Mary Lee Fitzhugh. George was the grandson of Martha Dandridge and step-grandson of President George Washington.
 
Lee was also a descendant of Charles II of England through Lady Charlotte Lee (granddaughter of Barbara Villiers), who married the 4th Baron Baltimore, and possibly, a descendant of George I, through Benedict Swingate Calvert (grandson of Lady Charlotte Lee), the illegitimate son of 5th Baron Baltimore and of an unknown mother, who was supposed to be Melusina von der Schulenburg, illegitimate daughter of the King.

See also

 List of American Civil War generals (Confederate)
 List of United States Congress members who died in office (1790–1899)

References

Further reading

 Eicher, John H., and David J. Eicher, Civil War High Commands. Stanford: Stanford University Press, 2001. .
 Freeman, Douglas S. R. E. Lee, A Biography. 4 vols. New York: Charles Scribner's Sons, 1934–35. .
 Longacre, Edward G. Lee's Cavalrymen: A History of the Mounted Forces of the Army of Northern Virginia. Mechanicsburg, PA: Stackpole Books, 2002. .
 Sifakis, Stewart. Who Was Who in the Civil War. New York: Facts On File, 1988. .
 Warner, Ezra J. Generals in Gray: Lives of the Confederate Commanders. Baton Rouge: Louisiana State University Press, 1959. .

External links

 Charlotte Lee, Wife Of William Henry Fitzhugh Lee
About Famous People: William Henry Fitzhugh Lee

1837 births
1891 deaths
19th-century American Episcopalians
American Civil War prisoners of war
American people of English descent
American planters
American slave owners
Bolling family of Virginia
Burials at University Chapel
Confederate States Army major generals
Custis family of Virginia
Fitzhugh family of Virginia
Harvard University alumni
Lee family of Virginia
Democratic Party members of the United States House of Representatives from Virginia
People from Arlington County, Virginia
People of Virginia in the American Civil War
Democratic Party Virginia state senators
Washington family
United States House of Representatives
19th-century American politicians